The Futsal tournament of the 2006 Lusophony Games was played in Macau, People's Republic of China. The venue was the Macao East Asian Games Dome. The tournament was played from 9  to 14 October 2006, and there was just the men's competition.

Despite drawing with Portugal in the final game and ending with the same points, Brazil eventually won the tournament by advantage on goal average.

Futsal medal table by country

Male Competition

Round Robin

References

See also
ACOLOP
Lusophony Games
2006 Lusophony Games

futsal
2006
2006 in futsal
2006
Futsal in Macau